Runnymede Independent Residents' Group was founded in 2001; it has held exactly one seventh of councillors' seats and formed the largest opposition party since the election it first contested in 2002.

Electoral performance

The Group was founded in 2001.  Its maximal representation has been six of about forty-two seats (the local elections occur in the bulk of years and the present number of councillors is 42) from 2002 to the time of writing, 2018. The group distribute campaign literature widely and have stood in a large minority of wards to Runnymede Borough Council.  No election was held in the year when the party was set up (elections occur in three out of four years). In 2015 and 2016 the sole opposition – body of councillors opposing the politically governing group – were the six candidates the Group who had won various prior elections; one opposition councillor of a different denomination, UKIP, having been ousted in the 2015 election.  An independent candidate elected in 2017 unaffiliated with the Group has diluted the majority on the council by one further seat.

Concentrated at present, the six councillors from Egham Town and Thorpe Ward are affiliated to the Group.

A Conservative majority has been present in the council chamber and committees since 1998. The Group in opposition has campaigned on issues including recycling and the building and extent of an incinerator.

The 2018 local elections resulted in a some changes of dynamic in RBC with the election of two independents in Foxhills Ward. The new independents have adopted the name 'Residents' Associations of Runnymede Independent'. Labour also made one gain in Egham Hythe. This means a total opposition of 10 in RBC.

References

External links
Runnymede Borough Councillors

Local government in Surrey
Borough of Runnymede
Locally based political parties in England